María Luisa ("Magüi") Serna Barrera (born 1 March 1979) is a former tennis player from Spain.

She started competing on the ITF Circuit as from 1993, and joined the WTA Tour in 1996. On 12 January 2004, she reached her career-high singles ranking of world No. 19.

Serna produced an upset by defeating Justine Henin in the 2001 Scottsdale tournament, 7–6, 7–6.

WTA career finals

Singles: 6 (3–3)

Doubles: 6 (2–4)

ITF Circuit finals

Singles (6–5)

Doubles (1–1)

Grand Slam singles performance timeline

Notes

External links
 
 
 

1979 births
Living people
Spanish female tennis players
Olympic tennis players of Spain
Tennis players at the 2000 Summer Olympics
Tennis players at the 2004 Summer Olympics
Sportspeople from Las Palmas